Arifile Mosque is in Sarail Upazila at Brahmanbaria District, Bangladesh, founded by Shah Arif in 1662. Name derived from Arif to Arifile. Locally known as Arail Mosque. This is an example of Mughal architecture, which combined Bengali, Persian and Islamic 
influences.

Location

Construction
Wonderful architectural techniques, styles and crafts outside the mosque reminds the beauty of the Taj Mahal. The mosque floor occupied by 24.38 m x 9.30 m rectangular area. Height nearly 8 m. Each wall is 1.6 m wide bearing weight of the roof. There is a yard affront the mosque boundary opened at a modern gate in the east. Four octagonal pillars making stronger the corners of the mosque and passing through the horizontal parapets those are topped with kalasa finials. Two bigger domes built on the roof keeping middle main dome, based on rectangular supporting structure inside the mosque like half domed vim. Out of five exits three in the east and each one in the north and south side, middle main door is bigger. All Mihrabs are similar in size except depth of the Middle of the West side. Ancient echo system applied here by smooth polishing of floor, walls, Mahrabs and domes inside to reflect addresses each corner equally. 
Arifile Mosque stands on the south-east of Sagardighi a big water resort. It was discovered and repaired between 2009 and 2010.

Mosque is designed by friezes of blind merlons spiral scroll on the frames of mihrabs and rectangular frames. Middle, north and south doors are deep arched alcove. Half domed vim and middle mihrab ornamented with muqarnas works in stucco.

Legacy
Tomb attached at the south outside of the mosque is known as 'Duel Grave'. In ancient time Sarail was the capital of Tripura State ruled by Isa Khan. According to the historians duel grave inside the Tumb are put up after the Mosque by him but other historians say those are his wives grave. Undiscovered Mysterious Tomb beneath the legend of the hidden tunnel still unknown its end.

This mosque is under care of Archeology Department of Bangladesh.

References

External links

16th-century architecture
Mughal mosques
Mosques in Bangladesh
Archaeological sites in Brahmanbaria district